Mohamed Sadeg Dhou (born 20 June 1994) is a Libyan professional footballer who plays as a midfielder for Ukrainian club Chaika.

Personal life 
Born in Libya, Dhou and his family moved to the Ukraine for work. He studied in an Arab school, and played football in the playground with his classmates. In the meantime, his parents returned to Libya, and Dhou remained to study at the institute.

Career 
Dhou began playing football for amateur club Lokomotyv Kyiv; noticed at a winter tournament by Chaika, Dhou initially refused to take part in a try-out. The two teams met each other once again: this time Dhou agreed to a try-out, and joined the Chaika.

In 2016–17 Dhou played five games in the Ukrainian Amateur League, and won the Ukrainian Amateur Cup. The following season, he helped his team gain promotion to the Ukrainian Second League, making his debut in the 2018–19 season on 22 July 2018, in a 3–0 away win against Bukovyna.

Honours 
Chaika
 Ukrainian Amateur Cup: 2016–17

References

External links
 
 
 Mohamed Dhou at pfl.ua

Living people
1994 births
Libyan emigrants to Ukraine
Libyan footballers
Association football midfielders
FC Lokomotyv Kyiv players
SC Chaika Petropavlivska Borshchahivka players
Ukrainian Amateur Football Championship players
Ukrainian Second League players
Libyan expatriate footballers
Libyan expatriate sportspeople in Ukraine
Expatriate footballers in Ukraine